The 1909 Invercargill mayoral election was held on 29 April 1909 as part of that year's local elections.

Former mayor Charles Stephen Longuet was elected again, ending the long second reign of William Benjamin Scandrett.

Results
The following table gives the election results:

References

1909 elections in New Zealand
Mayoral elections in Invercargill